Derevenka is a rural locality (a village) in Mayskoye Rural Settlement, Vologodsky District, Vologda Oblast, Russia. The population was 11 as of 2002.

Geography 
The village is located on Pochenga river. The distance to Vologda is 29 km, to Maysky is 14 km. Gorka, Zarya, Strelkovo, Goncharka are the nearest rural localities.

References 

Rural localities in Vologodsky District